Charlemagne was an 80-gun French ship of the line commissioned in 1852. The ship was in the Mediterranean Sea in 1852. The ship was sent by Napoleon III to the Black Sea as a show of force in violation of the London Straits Convention just prior to the Crimean War.

Notes

References
 Calhoun, Gordon "The Flagship's Roman Holiday, USS Cumberland's 1850s Mediterranean Cruises" The Day Book Vol 10 Issue 2 Hampton Roads Naval Museum <http://www.hrnm.navy.mil/daybooks/volumexissue2.pdf >
 Royle, Trevor Crimea: The Great Crimean War, 1854-1856 (2000) Palgrave Macmillan 

Ships of the line of the French Navy
1852 ships
Ships built in France
Crimean War naval ships of France